The Hyosung GT650 Comet is a motorcycle manufactured by Hyosung Motors & Machinery Inc. It is available in naked (GT650), half-fairing (GT650S), and full-fairing (GT650R) variants.

Cycle World recorded a tested 0-60mph time of 4.2 sec. and a 1/4 mile time of 12.84 sec. @ 102.22 mph.

References

External links
Model information, Hyosung
Hyosung GT650R Review, Motorcycle.com

GT650
Kasinski Comet GT650R